Naikanur is a village in Dharwad district of Karnataka, India.

Demographics 
As of the 2011 Census of India there were 253 households in Naikanur and a total population of 1,249 consisting of 625 males and 624 females. There were 167 children ages 0-6.

References

Villages in Dharwad district